Parabuccinum is a genus of sea snails, marine gastropod mollusks in the family Buccinulidae.

Species
Species within the genus Parabuccinum include:

 Parabuccinum rauscherti Harasewych, Kantor & Linse, 2000

References

External links

Buccinidae
Monotypic gastropod genera